Cauloramphus is a genus of bryozoans belonging to the family Calloporidae.

The species of this genus are found in Northern Hemisphere.

Species

Species:

Cauloramphus cymbaeformis 
Cauloramphus dicki 
Cauloramphus disjunctus

References

Bryozoan genera